The Amazing Race 5 is the fifth season of the American reality television show The Amazing Race. It featured eleven teams of two in a race around the world.

The season premiered on CBS on July 6, 2004, and concluded on September 21, 2004.

Married parents Chip and Kim McAllister were the winners of the season, while dating couple Colin Guinn and Christie Woods finished in second place, and models Brandon Davidson and Nicole O'Brian finished in third.

Production

Development and filming

After the anemic ratings for The Amazing Race 4, CBS chairman and CEO Les Moonves doubted whether the series would be renewed for another season. After much deliberation, CBS officially ordered a fifth installment of The Amazing Race in September 2003. Some observers cited the series' recent Emmy win as the factor behind its renewal. While CBS flirted with the idea of a fall premiere, it ultimately gave season 5 a summer broadcast to create momentum for The Amazing Race 6 on the fall schedule.

This season introduced two major twists to The Amazing Race: the Yield and the non-elimination penalty. The Yield allowed one team to force another team to stop racing for a predetermined amount of time. The Yield was available on each leg, except the last two, although it was not shown on each episode. The non-elimination penalty required teams finishing last on non-elimination legs to be stripped of any money they had accumulated and, in addition, they received no money at the start of the next leg. This was also the first season to see the number of Fast Forwards reduced; only two were available in the entire season.

Filming for The Amazing Race 5 began on January 30, 2004 and finished on February 27. This season traveled , which was the show's longest route yet, covering six continents and twelve countries. The teams visited nine countries not previously seen on the show: Uruguay, Argentina, Russia, Egypt, Kenya, Tanzania, the United Arab Emirates, the Philippines, and Canada.

During pre-production, the producers moved the Dubai leg from the originally planned location of Istanbul, Turkey. Istanbul was eventually visited on The Amazing Race 7. Production also moved the legs in the Philippines from Japan, but Japan was eventually visited on The Amazing Race 9.

The Zorb task in Leg 10 was filmed at a New Zealand farm owned by a friend of host Phil Keoghan. Prior to the season, Keoghan experienced rolling in the Zorb and insisted it be a task on the show.

Marshall & Lance were the first team in Amazing Race history to quit. When they arrived at the Roadblock site after all of the other teams had left, they decided to give up rather than complete the frustrating 'needle in a haystack' task during Leg 6 in Luxor, Egypt.

Cast

After two seasons that featured twelve teams, the contestant pool this season was reduced to eleven teams. They included a dating widowed couple, female twins, a former Big Brother contestant, and a team member with dwarfism. Alison Irwin of CBS's Big Brother 4 was the first contestant from a previously aired reality show to take part in The Amazing Race.

Following this season, Colin & Christie became engaged on CBS's Early Show.

Future appearances
Charla & Mirna returned to compete in The Amazing Race: All-Stars. Colin & Christie were also invited to participate in The Amazing Race: All-Stars, but had to decline due to Christie's pregnancy. They later competed on The Amazing Race: Reality Showdown in 2019.

Alison Irwin later appeared on Big Brother: All Stars. In 2005, Chip, Kim, Charla, and Mirna all competed on the Bravo reality series Battle of the Network Reality Stars, along with twenty-eight other individuals from various reality series.

Results
The following teams are listed with their placements in each leg. Placements are listed in finishing order. 
A  placement with a dagger indicates that the team was eliminated. 
An  placement with a double-dagger indicates that the team was the last to arrive at a pit stop in a non-elimination leg. As a penalty, they were stripped of all their money and were not given any at the start of the next leg.
A  indicates that the team won the Fast Forward. 
A  indicates that the team used the Yield and a  indicates the team on the receiving end of the Yield.

Notes

Race summary

Leg 1 (United States → Uruguay)

Episode 1: "Clearly, I'm More Intelligent than You" (July 6, 2004)
Prize: A vacation to Hawaii (awarded to Alison & Donny)
Eliminated: Dennis & Erika
Locations
Santa Monica, California (Santa Monica Pier) (Starting Line)
 Los Angeles → Montevideo, Uruguay
 Ciudad de la Costa → Punta del Este
Punta del Este (The Hand )
 Punta del Este → Gorriti Island
 Gorriti Island → Punta del Este
Maldonado (José Francisco González Meat Warehouse)
Maldonado (La Rosada Carniceria)
Punta del Este (Conrad Hotel ) 
Punta Ballena (Casapueblo) 
Episode summary
Teams set off from the Santa Monica Pier and drove themselves to Los Angeles International Airport, where they had to book one of two flights to Montevideo, Uruguay. The first flight on American Airlines carried four teams, while the second flight on United Airlines carried seven teams but arrived 25 minutes earlier than the first flight. Once in Montevideo, teams had to travel by bus to Punta del Este and find their next clue at The Hand.
Teams had to travel by boat to Gorriti Island in order to find their next clue, which instructed them to search for tickets hidden on trees for one of three departure times the next morning. Once teams claimed a ticket, they could not choose another one.
After returning to the mainland, teams had to search the dock for their next clue instructing them to travel to the José Francisco González Meat Warehouse in Maldonado in order to find their next clue. From the meat warehouse, teams had to carry a  slab of meat  to a butcher at La Rosada Carniceria in order to receive their next clue. Teams then had to travel to the Conrad Hotel in order to find their next clue.
 This season's first Detour was a choice between Zips or Chips. In Chips, teams had to play roulette in the hotel casino with 20 chips and received their next clue only if they won a game. If teams lost all of their chips, they would have to do the Zips task.
Teams had to check in at the pit stop: Casapueblo in Punta Ballena.
Additional notes
Miss Uruguay Natalia Rodriguez Lassiy, who competed in Miss World 2003, appeared as the pit stop greeter in this leg.

Leg 2 (Uruguay → Argentina)

Episode 2: "It Turned Ugly Just Now" (July 13, 2004)
Eliminated: Alison & Donny
Locations
Punta Ballena (Casapueblo) 
Montevideo (Shake Mega Disco)
 Colonia del Sacramento → Buenos Aires, Argentina
Buenos Aires (La Recoleta Cemetery)
Buenos Aires (La Recoleta Cemetery → Plaza de las Naciones Unidas  – Floralis Genérica  Teatro Lola Membrives ) 
San Antonio de Areco (La Estancia La Invernada) 
San Antonio de Areco (La Porteña) 
Episode summary
At the beginning of this leg, teams had to travel to Shake Mega Disco in Montevideo, where they had to find a plastic globe on the dance floor filled with foam that they had to rip open in order to retrieve the clue inside. Teams were then instructed to travel by ferry to Buenos Aires, Argentina. Once in Buenos Aires, teams had to find the grave of former Argentine First Lady Evita Perón, which they had to figure out was at the La Recoleta Cemetery, in order to find their next clue.
 This leg's Detour was a choice between Perro or Tango. In Perro, teams had to walk eight dogs on a  course while using a provided map to navigate past a series of three checkpoints to the Floralis Genérica in order to receive their next clue. In Tango, teams had to travel to the Teatro Lola Membrives, which was filled with tango dancers. Teams were given a photo of a tango dancer and had find the dancer who matched their photo in order to receive their next clue. If the teams gave the photo to the wrong dancer, they had to get a new picture and try again.
After completing the Detour, teams had to travel by taxi or bus to La Estancia La Invernada in San Antonio de Areco in order to find their next clue.
 In this season's first Roadblock, one team member had to enter a corral and attempt to remove a bandana from the neck of one of the calves in order to receive their next clue.
Teams had to travel by horse-drawn carriage to the pit stop at La Porteña.

Leg 3 (Argentina)

Episode 3: "I Got Electrocuted" (July 20, 2004)
Eliminated: Jim & Marsha
Locations
San Antonio de Areco (La Porteña) 
 Buenos Aires → San Carlos de Bariloche
San Carlos de Bariloche (Centro Cívico )
San Carlos de Bariloche (Del Turista Chocolate Factory) 
 Villa Cerro Catedral (Villa Catedral → Cerro Catedral) 
Río Negro (Bahia Lopez) 
Episode summary
At the start of this leg, teams had to drive to Aeroparque Jorge Newbery and catch a domestic flight to San Carlos de Bariloche in the Patagonia region of Argentina. Once there, they had to go to the Civic Center and find the mayor, who gave them their next clue. Teams then had to find the Del Turista Chocolate Factory in order to find their next clue.
 In this leg's Roadblock, one team member had to bite through 11,000 chocolates until they found one of only 20 with a white center, at which point they received their next clue.
After completing the Roadblock, teams had to drive to Villa Catedral and then take a gondola up Cerro Catedral in order to find their next clue.
 This leg's Detour was a choice between Smooth Sailing or Rough Riding. In Smooth Sailing, each team member had to paraglide in tandem with an instructor off the edge of the hill,  sail  through the air, and down to the base of the mountain. When they successfully landed, they received their next clue. In Rough Riding, each team had to ride a mountain bike  through a rugged trail course down the mountain in order to receive their next clue.
Teams had to check in at the pit stop: Bahia Lopez in Río Negro.

Leg 4 (Argentina → Russia)

Episode 4: "Who Says Pageant Girls Don't Eat?" (July 27, 2004)
Eliminated: Bob & Joyce
Locations
Río Negro (Bahia Lopez) 
 San Carlos de Bariloche → Buenos Aires
 Buenos Aires → Saint Petersburg, Russia
Saint Petersburg (Battleship Aurora)
Saint Petersburg (SKA Hockey Rink  Anichkov Palace) 
Saint Petersburg (Senate Square – Bronze Horseman)
Pushkin (Old Tower Restaurant) 
Pushkin (Catherine's Palace) 
Episode summary
At the beginning of this leg, teams were instructed to travel by bus back to Buenos Aires, and then to fly to Saint Petersburg, Russia. Once in Saint Petersburg, teams made their way to the battleship Aurora in order to find their next clue.
 This leg's Detour was a choice between Block 5 Shots or Drink 1 Shot. In Block 5 Shots, teams had to travel to the SKA hockey rink, dress in ice hockey gear, and block five shots by professional hockey players in front of the goal in order to receive their next clue. In Drink 1 Shot, teams had to travel to Anichkov Palace, where they had to balance a shot glass of vodka on the blade of a saber, tilt the sword to their mouth, and drink the vodka without dropping the glass in order to receive their next clue.
After completing the Detour, teams had to find their next clue at the Bronze Horseman statue at Senate Square. Teams then had to travel to Old Tower Restaurant in Pushkin in order to find their next clue.
 In this leg's Roadblock, one team member had to eat  of caviar in order to receive their next clue.
After completing the Roadblock, teams rode in a horse-drawn carriage to the pit stop at Catherine's Palace.

Leg 5 (Russia → Egypt)

Episode 5: "Are You Good at Puzzles?" (August 3, 2004)
Locations
Pushkin (Catherine's Palace) 
 Pushkin → Saint Petersburg
Saint Petersburg (Hermitage Museum)
 Saint Petersburg → Cairo, Egypt
Cairo (Tower of Cairo)
 Giza (Pharaonic Village → Qorsaya Island) 
Giza (Giza Pyramid Complex – Osiris Shaft) 
Giza (Pyramid of Khafre) 
Giza (Sphinx) 
Episode summary
At the beginning of this leg, teams had to return by train to Saint Petersburg and then make their way to the Hermitage Museum. There, teams had to find Rembrandt's The Return of the Prodigal Son, where they received their next clue from a curator, which instructed teams to fly to Cairo, Egypt. Once in Cairo, teams found their next clue at the Tower of Cairo.
 In this season's first Fast Forward, one team had to go to the Pharaonic Village and find a marked sarcophagus that they had to carry through the village, across the Nile River on a ferry, and to a temple on Qorsaya Island. Colin & Christie won the Fast Forward.
 In this leg's Roadblock, one team member had to descend down a series of ladders into the depths of the Osiris Shaft. There, they retrieved a satchel of puzzle pieces, which they had to carry back up the ladder to the surface and present to an Egyptologist in order to receive their next clue.
After completing the Roadblock, teams had to assemble the puzzle pieces on top of the marked area of a map in order to figure out their next destination: the base of the Pyramid of Khafre.
 This leg's Detour was a choice between Rock & Roll or Hump & Ride. In Hump & Ride, teams had to pick a pair of horses to lead camels laden with carpets  to a merchant in order to receive their next clue.
Teams had to check in at the pit stop: the Sphinx.
Additional notes
This was a non-elimination leg.

Leg 6 (Egypt)

Episode 6: "Why Can't We Get a Camel?" (August 10, 2004)
Prize: A vacation to Mexico (awarded to Colin & Christie)
Quit: Marshall & Lance
Locations
Giza (Sphinx) 
Giza (Great Pyramid)
 Cairo → Luxor
Luxor (Karnak)
Luxor (Nile River – Banana Island  Pigeon Farm) 
Luxor (Habu Temple) 
 Luxor → Crocodile Island 
Episode summary
At the beginning of this leg, teams had to descend  through a narrow shaft into the Creation Room inside the Great Pyramid in order to find their next clue, which instructed teams to fly to Luxor. Once in Luxor, teams traveled to the Karnak Temple Complex in order to find their next clue.
 This leg's Detour was a choice between Herd It or Haul It. In both tasks, teams had to travel on a traditional carriage known as a kalesh. In Herd It, teams had to travel to Banana Island and load ten goats into a sailboat and deliver them to a shepherd on the other side of the Nile in order to receive their next clue. In Haul It, teams traveled  to Pigeon Farm. Once there, teams had to use an ancient device to lift water from the Nile and fill an urn. Teams then had to transport the urn by donkey to a farmhouse and fill a cistern in order to receive their next clue.
After completing the Detour, teams had to travel to Habu Temple in order to find their next clue.
 In this leg's Roadblock, one team member had to choose a dig site and use archeological tools to dig in the sand until they unearthed a scarab in order to receive their next clue.
Teams had to check in at the pit stop: Crocodile Island along the Nile River.
Additional notes
Teams were instructed to take a charter flight to Luxor, but they could take a commercial flight if they could find one that would arrive in Luxor earlier.
Phil came out to the Roadblock site after being informed that Marshall & Lance wanted to quit The Amazing Race, noting that it was the first time that any team had quit the race, and the first time that Phil had to come meet a team on the race course and not at the pit stop. After Marshall & Lance confirmed that they wanted to quit on account of Marshall's injured knees, Phil informed them that the other teams had already checked into the pit stop, and they would have been eliminated anyway.

Leg 7 (Egypt → Kenya → Tanzania)

Episode 7: "Are You Sure This is Safe?" (August 17, 2004)
Prize: A vacation to Latin America (awarded to Chip & Kim)
Eliminated: Charla & Mirna
Locations
Luxor (Crocodile Island) 
 Luxor → Nairobi, Kenya
Nairobi (Z. Boskovic Air Charters) 
 Nairobi → Kilimanjaro, Tanzania
 Kilimanjaro → Mto wa Mbu 
Kibaoni (Kavishe Hotel) 
Lake Manyara National Park (Lake Manyara Lookout) 
Episode summary
At the beginning of this leg, teams were instructed to return to Cairo and then fly to Nairobi, Kenya. Once in Nairobi, teams went directly to Z. Boskovic Air Charters, where they had to sign up for one of three charter flights to a mystery destination (Kilimanjaro, Tanzania). After arriving in Kilimanjaro, teams had to travel by bus to Mto wa Mbu.
 This leg's Detour was a choice between Buzzing or Busy. In Buzzing, teams had to travel by bicycle to a local honey farm. There, they had to put on beekeeper suits and harvest  of honey from traditional African hives in order to receive their next clue. In Busy, teams have to find a specific shop, where they had to load two chairs onto a bicycle-driven cart. When they delivered the chairs to a specific address, the owner gave the teams a receipt. Teams had to return to the shopkeeper and give him the receipt in order to receive their clue.
After completing the Detour, teams had to travel to the Kavishe Hotel in order to find their next clue.
 In this leg's Roadblock, one team member had to cook and eat one ostrich egg in order to receive their next clue.

Leg 8 (Tanzania → United Arab Emirates)

Episode 8: "I'm Going to Jail" (August 24, 2004)
Prize: A vacation to the Caribbean (awarded to Colin & Christie)
Locations
Lake Manyara National Park (Lake Manyara Lookout) 
 Kilimanjaro → Dubai, United Arab Emirates
Dubai (Burj Al Arab)
 Dubai (Bur Dubai → Dubai Creek – Abdul Rahman's Dhow)
Margham (Dubai Desert Conservation Reserve – Margham Dunes) 
Margham (Dubai Desert Conservation Reserve – Desert Oasis) 
Episode summary
At the beginning of this leg, teams were instructed to fly to Dubai in the United Arab Emirates. Teams had to sign up for one of three charter flights to Nairobi, Kenya, and then from Nairobi, fly to Dubai. Once there, teams found their next clue on the helipad of the Burj Al Arab, which directed them to a dhow on Dubai Creek, where the owner gave them their next clue.
 This leg's Detour was a choice between Off Plane or Off Road. In Off Plane, teams had to travel to the Al Quwain Aero Club and tandem skydive  with an instructor to a landing site  in the Margham Dunes. When teams successfully landed, they received their next clue. Each plane could only carry one team and planes departed 45 minutes apart. In Off Road, teams had to travel directly to the Margham Dunes, where they had to drive a marked 4x4 over a  course through the desert ending at the skydiving landing site. If teams got stuck in the sand, they had to radio for help and wait to be extricated.
After completing the Detour, teams had to ride a camel and use a GPS navigation device to guide them to the pit stop.
Additional notes
This was a non-elimination leg.

Leg 9 (United Arab Emirates → India)

Episode 9: "If You're Going to Whine, Just Shut Up!" (August 31, 2004)
Prize: A vacation to Mexico (awarded to Colin & Christie)
Locations
Margham (Dubai Desert Conservation Reserve – Desert Oasis) 
Dubai (Wild Wadi Water Park – Jumeirah Sceirah)
 Dubai → Kolkata, India
Kolkata (Shaheed Minar)
Garia (Globe Brick Factory) 
Kolkata (Kripamayee Kali Temple) 
 Garia → Kolkata
Kolkata (Sealdah Railway Station)
Kolkata (Lansdowne Road) 
Kolkata (Victoria Memorial) 
Episode summary
At the start of this leg, teams drove themselves to Wild Wadi Water Park, where both team members had to ride down the Jumeirah Sceirah in order to receive their next clue. Teams were then instructed to fly to Kolkata, India. Once in Kolkata, teams found their next clue at the Shaheed Minar instructing them to travel to Globe Brick Factory in order to find their next clue.
 In this leg's Roadblock, one team member had to use a traditional Indian mold to make 20 mud bricks to the satisfaction of the factory worker in order to receive their next clue.
 In this season's only other fast Forward, one team would have had to travel  to a Hindu temple and have both of their heads completely shaved in order to win the Fast Forward award. Brandon & Nicole traveled to the temple, but when they discovered what the task entailed, they changed their minds and returned to the Roadblock.
After completing the Roadblock, teams had to travel by train to the Sealdah Railway Station in order to find their next clue.
 This leg's Detour was a choice between Heavy but Short or Light but Long. In Light but Long, teams would have had to travel to a flower market and find a particular stall in order to receive a garland, which they'd have had to release into the Ganges in order to receive their next clue. All teams chose to push the taxis.
Teams had to check in at the pit stop: the Victoria Memorial in Kolkata.
Additional notes
This was a non-elimination leg.

Leg 10 (India → New Zealand)

Episode 10: "If They're Screwing the Helmet to My Head, It Can't Be Good!" (September 7, 2004)
Prize: A vacation to Europe (awarded to Colin & Christie)
Eliminated: Kami & Karli
Locations
Kolkata (Victoria Memorial) 
 Kolkata → Auckland, New Zealand
Rotorua (Rotorua Museum)
Rotorua (Okere Falls  Hell's Gate) 
Paengaroa (Matapara Farms)  
Episode summary
At the beginning of this leg, teams were instructed to fly to Auckland, New Zealand. Once in Auckland, teams had to drive to Rotorua and find their next clue at the Rotorua Museum. 
 This leg's Detour was a choice between Clean or Dirty. In Clean, teams had to drive  to Okere Falls and perform an adventure sport called river sledging on the Kaituna River. With the help of two guides, teams had to complete a  course with only a small board (a sledge) for protection. At the end of the course, the instructor gave them their next clue. In Dirty, teams had to travel  to Hell's Gate and search within the marked area of a bubbling mud pit for their next clue.
After completing the Detour, teams had to drive to Matapara Farms in Paengaroa in order to find their next clue.
 In this leg's Roadblock, one team member had to inflate a Zorb, ride it down a hillside, and then walk it a short distance to cross the finish line at the bottom of the hill. Teams could then run to the pit stop.

Leg 11 (New Zealand → Philippines)

Episode 11: "It's Okay, Run Them Over!" (September 14, 2004)
Prize: A vacation to Hawaii (awarded to Chip & Kim)
Locations
Paengaroa (Matapara Farms) 
Auckland (Westhaven Marina)
 Auckland (Auckland Harbour Bridge) 
 Auckland → Manila, Philippines
Imus (Malagueña Motors) 
 Victoria (Field) 
Pasay (Coconut Palace) 
Episode summary
At the beginning of this leg, teams had to drive to the Westhaven Marina in Auckland, find a yacht called the Hydroflow, and lower their next clue from the yacht's rigging.
 In this leg's Roadblock, one team member had to travel by boat to Auckland Harbour Bridge and climb a  ladder to the girders beneath the roadway. From there, they had to walk along the girders to retrieve the clue on the other side, at which point they were then lowered to a waiting boat below.
Teams were instructed to fly to Manila, Philippines. Once in Manila, teams had to go to Malagueña Motors. There, teams had to decorate a jeepney with all of the provided items in order to receive their next clue. Teams were then driven to their next destination in the jeepney that they'd just decorated.
 This leg's Detour was a choice between Plow or Fowl. In Plow, teams had to use an ox-drawn plow to till a muddy field until the plow caught on a buried rope attached to a hidden clue. All teams opted to search the field with the ox-plow.
Teams had to check in at the pit stop: the Coconut Palace in Pasay.
Additional notes
 Chip & Kim chose to Yield Colin & Christie.
At the Detour, Colin had a meltdown trying to direct the ox through the field, leading him to angrily scream, "My ox is broken!" This scene became one of the most memorable and iconic scenes in the history of The Amazing Race.
The ox-plow task was revisited in season 25 as a Switchback.
Luli Arroyo, daughter of the then-Filipino president, Gloria Macapagal Arroyo, appeared as the pit stop greeter.
This was a non-elimination leg.

Leg 12 (Philippines)

Episode 12: "You've Just Made Me a Millionaire" (September 21, 2004)
Prize: A vacation to the Caribbean (awarded to Brandon & Nicole)
Eliminated: Linda & Karen
Locations
Pasay (Coconut Palace) 
Manila (Luneta Park – José Rizal Monument)
Pasay (A. Soriano Aviation)
 Manila → El Nido
 El Nido (El Nido Airport → El Nido Pier)
 El Nido (El Nido Pier → Bacuit Bay)
 El Nido (Pangulasian Island)
 El Nido (Lagen Wall) 
 El Nido (Lagen Island) 
Episode summary
At the beginning of this leg, teams had to find their next clue at the José Rizal Monument in Luneta Park, which directed them to A. Soriano Aviation, where teams had to sign up for one of two charter flights to El Nido. Once there, teams took a marked jeepney to El Nido Pier and a marked boat to a buoy, where they found their next clue. 
Teams had to use binoculars to search for the one island of three that was displaying the Philippine flag, where they would find their next clue. The other two islands were displaying flags of other nations and teams could not ask their guide for help. Teams found their next clue on the shore of Pangulasian Island, and they were instructed to put on snorkel gear and search underwater for one of four giant clams, which contained their next clue.
 In this leg's Roadblock, one team member had to climb the  Lagen Wall using an ascender, retrieve their next clue, and then rappel back down.
After completing the Roadblock, teams had to paddle a kayak to the pit stop on Lagen Island.

Leg 13 (Philippines → Canada → United States)

Episode 12: "You've Just Made Me a Millionaire" (September 21, 2004)
Winners: Chip & Kim
Second Place: Colin & Christie
Third Place: Brandon & Nicole
Locations
El Nido (Lagen Island) 
 El Nido → Calgary, Canada
 Calgary → Banff (Unaired)
Banff (Banff Springs Hotel)  (Unaired)
 Banff National Park (Sunshine Village – Lookout Mountain)
Calgary (Canada Olympic Park – Olympic Cauldron)
Calgary (Canada Olympic Park – Bobsleigh, Luge, and Skeleton Track  Downhill Course) 
 Calgary → Dallas, Texas
Fort Worth (Fort Worth Stockyards – Cowtown Cattlepen Maze)
Dallas (Trammell Crow Park) 
Episode summary
At the start of this leg, teams were instructed to fly to Calgary, Canada. Teams had to take a charter flight from El Nido to Manila, and then fly to Calgary. Once there, teams had to travel to Banff National Park and ride the gondola to Lookout Mountain. They then had to hike up a  snow slope to the Continental Divide in order to find their next clue, which directed them to the Olympic Cauldron in Canada Olympic Park.
 This season's final Detour was a choice between Slide or Ride. In Ride, teams had to ride mountain bikes through a snow-covered Olympic slalom ski course in three minutes or less to receive their next clue.
After completing the Detour, teams were instructed to fly to Dallas, Texas. Once in Dallas, teams had to go to the Fort Worth Stockyards. There, teams had to enter the giant maze and find a wooden box with their names on it, which contained a picture of the Canada Olympic Park. Using a provided key, they then had to take the picture, find their way out of the maze, and place it on the board. They then retrieved another key that unlocked the glass box on the board, which contained their final clue directing them to the finish line at Trammell Crow Park.
Additional notes
Teams traveled from Calgary to Banff by charter bus. This segment was unaired.
 In this season's final Roadblock, one team member had to build a First Nations teepee outside the Banff Springs Hotel. This task was unaired.
The task at the Fort Worth Stockyards was heavily truncated in the episode that aired. Teams actually had to enter the maze and find four wooden boxes with their names on it, each containing a picture of a place previously visited on the season (such as the Canada Olympic Park), using the four keys provided on their respective boards. They then had to take the picture, find their way out of the maze, and place it on the board. They had to repeat the process for the other two locations with pictures in numerical order. The fourth and last key on the board opened a wooden box which contained another key that unlocked the glass box on the board, which contained their final clue. The episode only showed teams looking for the photograph of the Canada Olympic Park and then finding the box with the key.
Legs 12 and 13 aired back-to-back as a special two-hour episode.

Reception

Critical response
The Amazing Race 5 received positive reviews. Maureen Ryan of the Chicago Tribune called this season a "breakout success". In 2016, this season was ranked 1st out of the first 27 seasons by the Rob Has a Podcast Amazing Race correspondents. Kareem Gantt of Screen Rant called it "an otherwise near-perfect season." In 2021, Jane Andrews of Gossip Cop ranked this season as the show's 2nd best season. In 2022, Jason Shomer of Collider ranked this season among the show's top seven seasons. In 2022, Rhenn Taguiam of Game Rant ranked this season as the tenth-best season.

Ratings
U.S. Nielsen ratings

References

External links
Official website

 05
2004 American television seasons
Television shows filmed in California
Television shows filmed in Uruguay
Television shows filmed in Argentina
Television shows filmed in Germany
Television shows filmed in Russia
Television shows filmed in France
Television shows filmed in Egypt
Television shows filmed in Bahrain
Television shows filmed in Kenya
Television shows filmed in Tanzania
Television shows filmed in the United Arab Emirates
Television shows filmed in India
Television shows filmed in Thailand
Television shows filmed in New Zealand
Television shows filmed in Singapore
Television shows filmed in Hong Kong
Television shows filmed in the Philippines
Television shows filmed in Alberta
Television shows filmed in Colorado
Television shows filmed in Texas